This is a compilation of Olimpia Cluj's matches in official international women's football competitions. Olimpia has represented Romania in all editions of the UEFA Women's Champions League since their debut in the 2011-12 season, and they have been knocked out in the Round of 16 once, in the Round of 32 twice and in the qualifying round in four occasions. After the 2016–17 season they hold a 15 – 2 – 9 record in the competition.

Overall record

2011-12 UEFA Women's Champions League

Preliminary stage

Round of 32

2012-13 UEFA Women's Champions League

Qualifying stage

Round of 32

Round of 16

2013-14 UEFA Women's Champions League

Preliminary stage

2014-15 UEFA Women's Champions League

Preliminary stage

2015-16 UEFA Women's Champions League

Preliminary stage

Round of 32

2016-17 UEFA Women's Champions League

Preliminary stage

References

Olimpia Cluj